Ramón Antonio Castillo Barrionuevo (November 20, 1873 – October 12, 1944) was a conservative Argentine politician who served as President of Argentina from June 27, 1942 to June 4, 1943. He was a leading figure in the period known as the Infamous Decade, characterised by electoral fraud, corruption, and rule by conservative landowners heading the alliance known as the Concordancia.

Castillo graduated in law from the University of Buenos Aires (UBA) and began a judicial career. He reached the Appeals Chamber of commercial law before retiring and dedicating himself to teaching. He was professor and dean at UBA between 1923 and 1928.

Castillo was named Federal Intervenor of Tucumán Province in 1930. From 1932 until 1935, he was elected to the Argentine Senate for Catamarca Province for the National Democratic Party and was also Minister of Interior.

From 1938 to 1942, Castillo was vice-president of Argentina under President Roberto Ortiz, who won the election by fraud as the head of the Concordancia. He served as acting president from July 3, 1940 to June 27, 1942 due to the illness of President Ortiz, who did not resign until less than a month before his death. Castillo maintained Argentina's neutrality during World War II. He was overthrown in the Revolution of '43 military coup in the midst of an unpopular attempt to impose Robustiano Patrón Costas as his successor. Juan Domingo Perón was a junior officer in the coup.

References

External links
 

1873 births
1944 deaths
People from Catamarca Province
Vice presidents of Argentina
Presidents of Argentina
Foreign ministers of Argentina
World War II political leaders
People of the Infamous Decade
20th-century Argentine judges
Members of the Argentine Senate for Catamarca
University of Buenos Aires alumni
Leaders ousted by a coup
National Democratic Party (Argentina) politicians
Ministers of Internal Affairs of Argentina